Amauropelta elegantula, synonym Thelypteris elegantula, is a species of fern in the family Thelypteridaceae. It is native to Colombia and Ecuador. Its natural habitat is subtropical or tropical moist montane forests. It is threatened by habitat loss.

References

 

Thelypteridaceae
Flora of Colombia
Flora of Ecuador
Vulnerable flora of South America
Taxonomy articles created by Polbot
Taxobox binomials not recognized by IUCN